Acacia difformis is a shrub or small tree in the Fabaceae family that is native to New South Wales and Victoria and grows to a height of . Common names include Drooping wattle, Wyalong wattle or Mystery wattle. Acacia difformis grows in sandy soils, open forests, and usually occurs in mallee communities. the name difformis comes from post-classical Latin which means irregularly or unevenly or differently formed.

It was first described in 1897 by Richard Baker.

See also
List of Acacia species

References

difformis
Fabales of Australia
Plants described in 1897
Taxa named by Richard Thomas Baker